Blackfella (also blackfellah, blackfulla, black fella, or black fellah) is an informal term in Australian English to refer to Indigenous Australians, in particular Aboriginal Australians, most commonly among themselves.

Similarly, the term Whitefella, especially in Aboriginal use, refers to non-Aboriginal or European Australians.

See also
 "Blackfella/Whitefella", a song by Warumpi Band, co-written by singer George Rrurrambu and guitarist Neil Murray.
 Blackfella Films, a film production company founded and run by Rachel Perkins
 Blackfellas, 1993 film adaptation of Archie Weller's 1981 novel The Day of the Dog
 
 Koori, demonym used by Aboriginal people in Victoria and New South Wales
 List of Australian Aboriginal group names
 Black Australians (disambiguation)

References

External links
 Blackfella, Whitefella film
"Blackfella/Whitefella'' by the Warumpi Band

Australian Aboriginal culture
Australian English
Australian slang